is Yukihiro Takahashi's self-produced 1981 album and featured his YMO colleagues Haruomi Hosono and Ryuichi Sakamoto on keyboards, as well as contributions from Tony Mansfield of New Musik and Roxy Music's Phil Manzanera and Andy Mackay. The title is a pun on the early 1980s British fashion movement, the New Romantics.

Track listing

Personnel
Yukihiro Takahashi – vocals, drums, keyboards, mixing
Haruomi Hosono – keyboards
Ryuichi Sakamoto – keyboards
Kenji Omura and Phil Manzanera – guitars
Tony Mansfield – keyboards, backing vocals
Andy Mackay – saxophones, oboe
Hideki Matsutake – computer programming and operation
Shoro Kawazoe – executive producer
Yukimasa Okumura, Hiromi Kanai, Tomohiro Itami – artwork
Mitsuo Koike – engineer
Steve Nye – engineer, mixing
Ian Little, Renata Blauel, Yoshifumi Ito – assistant engineer
Masayoshi Sukita, Sheila Rock – photography
Kazusuke Obi – artist relations
Hiroshi Kato, Toshi Yajima – recording coordination
Lorraine Kinman – stylist
Takeshi Fujii – equipment
Peter Barakan, Yoichi Ito – management

References

1981 albums
Yukihiro Takahashi albums
Alfa Records albums